The London Fire Commissioner (LFC) is a functional body of the Greater London Authority, with responsibility for the governance of the London Fire Brigade. It is a corporation sole and is the fire authority of Greater London. It replaced the London Fire and Emergency Planning Authority on 1 April 2018.

History
The London Fire Commissioner was created on 1 April 2018 as part of a nationwide reform of governance following the Policing and Crime Act 2017. It replaced the London Fire and Emergency Planning Authority.

Governance
The London Fire Commissioner is the body responsible for the governance of the London Fire Brigade. It is a incorporated as a corporation sole and is the fire and rescue authority for London. It is a functional body of the Greater London Authority. The Mayor of London is ultimately responsible for setting the organisation budget and approving the London Safety Plan. There is a Deputy Mayor for Fire and Resilience who acts on behalf of the mayor. All these structures are scrutinised by the Fire, Resilience and Emergency Planning Committee of the London Assembly.

References

Local government in London
Emergency management in the United Kingdom
Greater London Authority functional bodies
2018 establishments in England
Government agencies established in 2018
Major precepting authorities in England